Thomas M. Cover [ˈkoʊvər] (August 7, 1938 – March 26, 2012) was an American information theorist and professor jointly in the Departments of Electrical Engineering and Statistics at Stanford University. He devoted almost his entire career to developing the relationship between information theory and statistics.

Early life and education
He received his B.S. in Physics from MIT in 1960 and Ph.D. in electrical engineering from Stanford University in 1964.

Career
Cover was President of the IEEE Information Theory Society and was a Fellow of the Institute of Mathematical Statistics and of the Institute of Electrical and Electronics Engineers.  He received the Outstanding Paper Award in Information Theory for his 1972 paper "Broadcast Channels"; he was selected in 1990 as the Shannon Lecturer, regarded as the highest honor in information theory; in 1997 he received the IEEE Richard W. Hamming Medal; and in 2003 he was elected to the American Academy of Arts and Sciences.

During his 48-year career as a professor of Electrical Engineering and Statistics at Stanford University, he graduated 64 PhD students, authored over 120 journal papers in learning, information theory, statistical complexity, pattern recognition, and portfolio theory; and he partnered with Joy A. Thomas to coauthor the book Elements of Information Theory, which has become the most widely used textbook as an introduction to the topic since the publication of its first edition in 1991. He was also coeditor of the book Open Problems in Communication and Computation.

Selected works
 
 
 Van Campenhout, Jan. and Cover, T. (1981). Maximum entropy and conditional probability. Information Theory, IEEE Transactions on
 Cover, T. (1974). The Best Two Independent Measurements Are Not the Two Best. Systems, Man and Cybernetics, IEEE Transactions on
 Cover, T. and Hart, P. (1967). Nearest neighbor pattern classification.] Information Theory, IEEE Transactions on.
 Cover, T. (1965). [http://ieeexplore.ieee.org/xpls/abs_all.jsp?arnumber=4038449 Geometrical and Statistical Properties of Systems of Linear Inequalities with Applications in Pattern Recognition. Electronic Computers, IEEE Transactions on

See also
 k-nearest neighbors algorithm
 Cover's theorem

References

External links
 Thomas M. Cover Stanford University homepage
 

1938 births
2012 deaths
American statisticians
Fellow Members of the IEEE
Fellows of the Institute of Mathematical Statistics
Members of the United States National Academy of Engineering
People from San Bernardino, California
Probability theorists
Stanford University School of Engineering alumni
Stanford University School of Engineering faculty